This was the first edition of the event.

Scott Davis and Ben Testerman won the title, defeating Paul Annacone and Glenn Michibata 6–4, 6–4 in the final.

Seeds

  Fritz Buehning /  Peter Fleming (first round)
  John Alexander /  Johan Kriek (semifinals)
  Larry Stefanki /  Robert Van't Hof (first round)
  Tony Giammalva /  John Lloyd (first round)

Draw

Draw

External links
 Draw

1984 Livingston Open
1984 Grand Prix (tennis)